The following lists events that happened in 1944 in Iceland.

Incumbents
Monarch - Kristján X (until 17 June 1944)
President – Sveinn Björnsson (after 17 June 1944)
Prime Minister – Ólafur Thors

Events

February
 February 25 - The Republic of Iceland is founded.

June
 June 17 - Sveinn Björnsson became the first President of Iceland.

References

 
1940s in Iceland
Iceland
Iceland
Years of the 20th century in Iceland